Gennady Slepnyov (21 July 1921 – 9 August 2002) was a Soviet sprinter. He competed in the men's 4 × 400 metres relay at the 1952 Summer Olympics.

References

1921 births
2002 deaths
Athletes (track and field) at the 1952 Summer Olympics
Soviet male sprinters
Olympic athletes of the Soviet Union
Place of birth missing